CRT Line 6 (and the branch line branded as International Expo line) is the second heavy rail subway line in Chongqing, as well as being the longest rapid transit line in China, at 85.6 km long. It opened with provisional revenue service on September 28, 2012, and connects Nan'an, Yuzhong, and Jiangbei districts in central Chongqing.

Opening timeline

Stations (south to north)

Operational

Under Construction
Covering a distance of 6.7 km, this extension starts from Liujiaping station and branches off towards Chongqing East Station, with 2 stations in between. The project began on 28 March 2022.

Features

Caijia Rail Transit Bridge 
The line crosses the Jialing River via Caijia Rail Transit Bridge. Construction work began in October 2010 and it was completed in December 2013.

References

 
Railway lines opened in 2012
2012 establishments in China